Drinkstone  is a small settlement and civil parish in Suffolk, England. Its name is derived from Dremic's homestead. It was located in the hundred of Thedwastre. It is mentioned in the Domesday Book of 1086.

All Saints' Church dates from the 14th century. The tower was added c.1760 and the church restored in 1866–72. It is a grade II* listed building.

Drinkstone windmills are a pair of windmills in the parish consisting of a post mill and a smock mill.

Second World War
The 2024 Quartermaster Truck Company (Aviation) of the United States Army Air Force was stationed here in 1945.

Notable people
 Joshua Grigby MP, settled in Drinkstone, building a mansion at Drinkstone Park in 1760.

References

External links

Villages in Suffolk
Mid Suffolk District
Civil parishes in Suffolk
Thedwastre Hundred